Adele Enersen is an author, illustrator, screenwriter, photographer and blogger originally from Helsinki, Finland.

Enersen created a blog, Mila's Daydreams, where she posted photographs which she had taken of her baby daughter Mila in different costumes and props while she was asleep. The blog attracted worldwide attention from writers on the subject of parenting.

Enersen signed a publishing deal with HarperCollins, and created two books, When My Baby Dreams and When My Baby Dreams Fairytales.
With her third book Vincent and the Night, she signed a deal with Dial Pres, Penguin Random House. The book was immediately listed "Best Book of the Month" Editor's pick in Amazon.com.

After the blog's popularity her books and illustrations were featured on international television news, were reviewed in magazines and websites around the world, which in turn increased the readership of her blog.

References

External links
adeleenersen.com Official website 
Mila's Daydreams

Year of birth missing (living people)
Living people
Writers from Helsinki
Finnish photographers
Finnish women writers
Finnish screenwriters
Finnish women photographers
Finnish women illustrators
Finnish women screenwriters
Finnish bloggers
Finnish women bloggers
Artists from Helsinki
Finnish expatriates in the United States
21st-century screenwriters